Frances Marion (born Marion Benson Owens, November 18, 1888 – May 12, 1973) was an American screenwriter, director, journalist and author often cited as one of the most renowned female screenwriters of the 20th century alongside June Mathis and Anita Loos. During the course of her career, she wrote over 325 scripts. She was the first writer to win two Academy Awards. Marion began her film career working for filmmaker Lois Weber. She wrote numerous silent film scenarios for actress Mary Pickford, before transitioning to writing sound films.

Early life 
Marion was born Marion Benson Owens in San Francisco, California, to Len D. Owens and Minnie Benson. She had an older sister, Maude, and a younger brother, Len. Her parents divorced when she was 10, and she lived with her mother. She dropped out of school at age 12, after having been caught drawing a cartoon strip of her teacher. She then transferred to a school in San Mateo and then to the Mark Hopkins Art Institute in San Francisco when she was 16 years old. Marion attended this school from 1904 until the school was destroyed by the fire that followed in the wake of the 1906 San Francisco earthquake.

Career 
While in San Francisco, Marion worked as a photographer's assistant to Arnold Genthe and experimented with photographic layouts and color film. Later she worked for Western Pacific Railroads as a commercial artist, then as a reporter for the San Francisco Examiner. After moving to Los Angeles, Marion worked as a poster artist for the Morosco Theater as well as an advertising firm doing commercial layouts.

In the summer of 1914 she was hired as a writing assistant, an actress and general assistant by Lois Weber Productions, a film company owned and operated by pioneer female film director Lois Weber. She could have been an actor, but preferred work behind the camera.

When Lois Weber went to work for Universal, she offered to bring Marion with her. Marion decided not to take Weber up on the offer. Soon after, close friend Mary Pickford offered Marion a job at Famous Players-Lasky. Marion accepted, and began working on scenarios for films like Fanchon the Cricket, Little Pal, and Rags. Marion was then cast alongside Pickford in A Girl of Yesterday. At the same time, she worked on an original scenario for Pickford to star in, The Foundling. Marion sold the script to Adolph Zukor for $125. The film was shot in New York, and Moving Picture World gave it a positive pre-release review. But the film negative was destroyed in a laboratory fire before prints could be made.

Marion, having traveled from Los Angeles to New York for The Foundling's premiere, applied for work as a writer at World Films and was hired for an unpaid two-week trial. For her first project, she decided to try recutting existing films that had been shelved as unreleasable. Marion wrote a new prologue and epilogue for a film starring Alice Brady, daughter of World Films boss William Brady. The new portions turned the film from a laughable melodrama into a comedy. The revised film sold for distribution for $9,000, and Brady gave Marion a $200/week contract for her writing services.

Soon Marion became head of the writing department at World Films, where she was credited with writing 50 films. She left in 1917 when, following the success of The Poor Little Rich Girl, Famous Players-Lasky signed her to a $50,000 a year contract as Mary Pickford's official scenarioist. Marion was reported at this time to be "one of the highest paid script writers in the business." Her first project under the contract was an adaptation of Rebecca of Sunnybrook Farm.

Marion worked as a journalist and served overseas as a combat correspondent during World War I. She documented women's contribution to the war effort on the front lines, and was the first woman to cross the Rhine after the armistice.

Upon Marion's return from Europe in 1919, William Randolph Hearst offered her $2,000 a week to write scenarios for his Cosmopolitan Productions. Marion shared a house with fellow screenwriter Anita Loos on Long Island.

While at Cosmopolitan, Marion wrote an adaptation of Fannie Hurst's Humoresque which was Cosmopolitan's first successful film, and also was the first film to win the Photoplay Medal of Honor, a precursor of the Academy Award for Best Picture. Marion told her best friend Mary Pickford the story she heard during her recent honeymoon in Italy for which Pickford said it was the next movie she wanted to do. Pickford insisted that Marion not only be the writer but also the director of the film, and the result was Marion's directorial debut The Love Light. Her earlier success in adapting the Fannie Hurst novel and her friendship with Hurst contributed to her decision to adapt another Hurst story, "Superman," as her next movie to direct. The resulting film, Just Around the Corner, was a best-seller for the studio. Marion directed only one more movie The Song of Love, co-directing it with Chester Franklin.

She won the Academy Award for Writing in 1931 for the film The Big House, she received the Academy Award for Best Story for The Champ in 1932, both featuring Wallace Beery, and co-wrote Min and Bill starring her friend Marie Dressler and Beery in 1930. She was credited with writing 300 scripts and over 130 produced films.

Personal life 

On October 23, 1915, Marion participated in a parade of more than thirty thousand supporters of women's suffrage in New York City.

After her success in Hollywood, Marion often visited Aetna Springs Resort in Aetna Springs, California, using it as a personal retreat and often bringing several film-industry colleagues with her on vacations. The resort, in fact, was directly connected to her own family's history, for Marion's father had built the resort in the 1870s.Marion was married four times, first to Wesley de Lappe and then to Robert Pike, both prior to changing her name. In 1919, she wed Fred Thomson, who co-starred with Mary Pickford in The Love Light in 1921. She was such close friends with Mary Pickford that they honeymooned together when Mary married Douglas Fairbanks and Frances married Fred. After Thomson's unexpected death from a leg wound in 1928, she married director George Hill in 1930, but that marriage ended in divorce in 1933. She had two sons—Frederick C. Thomson and Richard Thomson (adopted). Frederick earned a PhD in English at Yale, taught there and later joined the faculty of the University of North Carolina. He became an editor of the writings of George Eliot, publishing editions of Felix Holt, the Radical in 1980 and later.

Later years and death 
For many years she was under contract to MGM Studios. Independently wealthy, she left Hollywood in 1946 to devote more time to writing stage plays and novels.

Frances Marion published a memoir Off With Their Heads: A Serio-Comic Tale of Hollywood in 1972. Marion died the following year of a ruptured aneurysm in Los Angeles.

Selected filmography

Published works 
Minnie Flynn. NY: Boni and Liveright, 1925
The Secret Six. NY: Grosset & Dunlap, 1931 [novelization of her own screenplay]
Valley People. NY: Reynal & Hitchcock, 1935
How to Write and Sell Film Stories. NY: Covici-Friede, 1937
Molly, Bless Her. NY: Harper & Brothers, 1937
Westward The Dream. Garden City NY: Doubleday and Company, 1948
 The Passions of Linda Lane. NY: Diversey Publications, 1949 [paperback; revised edition of Minnie Flynn]
The Powder Keg. Boston: Little, Brown & Co., 1953
Off With Their Heads!: A Serio-Comic Tale of Hollywood. NY: The Macmillan Company, 1972 [memoir]

Bibliography 

Beauchamp, C. Marion, Frances. American National Biography Online, February 2000.

References

External links 

Frances Marion  at the Women Film Pioneers Project

Frances Marion article in Photoplay 1917

1888 births
1973 deaths
American women film directors
Screenwriters from California
20th-century American novelists
American women novelists
Writers from San Francisco
American women screenwriters
American women in World War I
People from Napa County, California
Best Story Academy Award winners
Best Adapted Screenplay Academy Award winners
American women journalists
20th-century American women writers
Journalists from California
Novelists from California
Women film pioneers
Film directors from San Francisco
20th-century American non-fiction writers
20th-century American screenwriters